South Glamorganshire may refer to:

 South Glamorgan, a historic county in Wales
 South Glamorganshire (UK Parliament constituency)